Daniel Briley (born June 30, 1952), better known by the ring name "Nightmare" Danny Davis, is an American retired professional wrestler and referee. He is the founder and former owner of Ohio Valley Wrestling.

Career
Briley started wrestling in 1977 in the Tennessee territory, where he made a name for himself as "Nightmare" Danny Davis. He would also wrestle as one half of the masked Masters of Terror in the United States Wrestling Association. Davis had a frequent tag team with Ken Wayne in the 1980s. At one time, they wrestled under masks as The Nightmares. The duo also worked under masks as The Galaxians for WCW in the 1990s.

Davis also had a brief stint during the latter days of the Central States/Kansas City territory as Tiger Mask, which occurred a few years after Satoru Sayama's tour of the WWF introduced American audiences to the gimmick. He also wrestled in Smoky Mountain Wrestling in 1992. He retired in 1997 and opened Ohio Valley Wrestling. In 2009, Davis opened Vyper Fight League, an MMA promotion, alongside John "Bradshaw" Layfield. The promotion ceased operations in 2010.

On December 13, 2012, he appeared on a segment of Impact Wrestling where he was training Joseph Park to improve Park's skills. On March 7, 2013, he was named as a judge for TNA Gut Check. He returned to in-ring action in the December 2014 Saturday Night Special, teaming with Trailer Park Trash and losing to War Machine (Shiloh Jonze and Eric Locker).

On April 6, 2018, Davis sold OVW to Al Snow.

Personal life
Briley has two sons, Stewart Davis and Simon Davis-Millis. He is the uncle of wrestler Doug Basham.

Championships and accomplishments
Continental Championship Wrestling / Continental Wrestling Federation
NWA Southeastern Continental Tag Team Championship (1 time) - with Ken Wayne
NWA Southeastern Heavyweight Championship (Northern Division) (1 time)
NWA Southeastern Tag Team Championship (3 times) - with Ken Wayne
NWA Southeastern United States Junior Heavyweight Championship (5 times)

Continental Wrestling Association
AWA Southern Tag Team Championship (1 time) - with Ken Wayne

Deep South Wrestling
DSW Tag Team Championship (3 times, inaugural) - with Ken Wayne

Global Wrestling Federation
GWF Light Heavyweight Championship (3 times)

Stampede Wrestling
NWA International Tag Team Championship (Calgary version) (1 time) - with Hubert Gallant
Stampede British Commonwealth Mid-Heavyweight Championship (1 time)

United States Wrestling Association
USWA Junior Heavyweight Championship (7 times)
USWA Middleweight Championship (1 time)

References

External links
 

American male professional wrestlers
Living people
Professional wrestling executives
1952 births
Professional wrestling trainers
Professional wrestling promoters
Ohio Valley Wrestling
Stampede Wrestling alumni
Professional wrestling referees
20th-century professional wrestlers
GWF Light Heavyweight Champions
Stampede Wrestling British Commonwealth Mid-Heavyweight Champions
Stampede Wrestling International Tag Team Champions